Shrikant is a TV show based on Sarat Chandra Chattopadhyaya's 1917-1933 four volume novel Srikanta. The show aired on Doordarshan in 1987.

The show was again telecast on DD National from 30 April 2020 during the lockdown due to coronavirus

Synopsis 
The show tells the story of protagonist Shrikant (Farooque Shaikh). Sujata Mehta plays Raj Lakshmi. She nurses him to health when he is infected by plague. Later during a sea voyage to Burma, he meets Abhaya (Mrinal Kulkarni), a woman abandoned by her husband (Irrfan Khan).
In Burma, he receives the devotion of a lodge caretaker played by Sukanya Kulkarni. His love ideal remains Rajlakshmi.

Cast 
 Farooque Shaikh as Shrikant
Mrinal Kulkarni as Abhaya
 Ravindra Mankani as Rohini
 Irrfan Khan as Abhaya's husband
Sujata Mehta as Raj Lakshmi
 Sukanya Kulkarni
 Tiku Talsania
 Asha Sharma
Urvashi Dholakia as younger Raj Lakshmi

References

External links 
 

1980s Indian television series
1985 Indian television series debuts
1986 Indian television series endings
DD National original programming
Television shows based on Indian novels
Television shows set in Myanmar